Simpsonichthys ocellatus is a species of killifish from the family Rivulidae.
It is found in the Jequitinhonha River basin in Brazil in South America. 

References

ocellatus
Fish of the Jequitinhonha River basin
Taxa named by Wilson José Eduardo Moreira da Costa
Taxa named by Dalton Tavares Bressane Nielsen
Taxa named by André Cordeiro de Luca
Fish described in 2001